Tyler County is the name of two counties in the United States:

Tyler County, Texas
Tyler County, West Virginia